The 2016–17 FC Lokomotiv Moscow season was the club's 25th season in the Russian Premier League, the highest tier of association football in Russia. Overall, Lokomotiv's performance in Premier League was disappointing as Lokomotiv ended in the 8th place. Lokomotiv Moscow participated in and won the Russian Cup, thereby also qualifying to the 2017-2018 UEFA Europa League.

First Team Squad

Information

Players and squad numbers last updated on 3 February 2017.Note: Flags indicate national team as has been defined under FIFA eligibility rules. Players may hold more than one non-FIFA nationality.

Transfers
Note: Flags indicate national team as has been defined under FIFA eligibility rules. Players may hold more than one non-FIFA nationality.

Arrivals

Departures

Friendlies

Pre-season

Mid-season

Competitions

Overview

Russian Premier League

League table

Results by round

Matches

Russian Cup

Awards

Lokomotiv player of the month award

Awarded monthly to the player that was chosen by fan voting on Lokomotiv's official portal on VK.

References

FC Lokomotiv Moscow seasons
Lokomotiv Moscow